Atabai (Persian: آتابای) is a 2020 Iranian romantic drama film directed by Niki Karimi and written by Hadi Hejazifar and Karimi. The film screened for the first time at the 38th Fajr Film Festival and earned 5 nominations.

Premise 
The story is about Kazem a middle aged man who lives in a village. He has left the university because of a former love but when two sisters enter his life he falls in love once again.

Cast 

 Hadi Hejazifar as Kazem / Atabai
 Sahar Dolatshahi as Sima
 Javad Ezzati as Yahya
 Danial Noroush as Aydin
 Masoumeh Rabaninia as Jeyran
Mahlagha Meynoosh Zad as Simin
 Yousefali Daryadel as Kazem's Father

Reception

Accolades

See also 
 Coal 
 3 Faces
 The Song of Sparrows

References

External links 
 

2020s Persian-language films
Azerbaijani-language films in Iran
2020 romantic drama films
Iranian romantic drama films
2020 multilingual films
Iranian multilingual films